The 1933 Penn State Nittany Lions football team represented the Pennsylvania State College in the 1933 college football season. The team was coached by Bob Higgins and played its home games in New Beaver Field in State College, Pennsylvania.

Schedule

References

Penn State
Penn State Nittany Lions football seasons
Penn State Nittany Lions football